The 1835 Alabama gubernatorial election was an election held on August 3, 1835, to elect the governor of Alabama. Democratic candidate Clement Comer Clay beat Whig candidate Enoch Parsons with 65.44% of the vote.

General election

Candidates
Clement Comer Clay, Representative for 1st congressional district 1829–1835.
Enoch Parsons, President of Middletown branch, Bank of America 1818–1824.

Results

By county

References

Notes 

Alabama gubernatorial elections
Alabama
1835 Alabama elections
August 1835 events